Huang Le (born 10 September 1977) is a retired male long jumper from PR China.

He won the bronze medal at the 2002 Asian Championships. His personal best jump is 8.21 metres, achieved when he won the 1999 World Military Games in Zagreb.

Achievements

References

1977 births
Living people
Chinese male long jumpers
Athletes (track and field) at the 2002 Asian Games
Asian Games competitors for China
Competitors at the 2003 Summer Universiade
21st-century Chinese people